Montagu is a rural locality in the local government area (LGA) of Circular Head in the North-west and west LGA region of Tasmania. The 2016 census recorded a population of 92 for the state suburb of Montagu.

History 
Montagu was gazetted as a locality in 1967. The Montagu River and the locality were named for John Montagu, who was Colonial Secretary of Van Diemen's Land from 1834 to 1842.

Geography
The Montagu River forms the western boundary, and the waters of Robbins Passage form the northern.

Road infrastructure 
Route C215 (Montagu Road) runs through from east to west.

See also
 Robbins Passage and Boullanger Bay Important Bird Area

References

Towns in Tasmania
Localities of Circular Head Council